Carentan Airfield is an abandoned World War II military airfield, which is located near the commune of Carentan in  the Normandy region of northern France.

Located just outside Carentan, the United States Army Air Force established a temporary airfield 15 June 1944, nine days after the first Allied landings in France on D-Day and only three days after the capture of Carentan. The airfield was one of the first established in the liberated area of Normandy, being constructed by the IX Engineering Command, 826th Engineer Aviation Battalion.

History
Known as Advanced Landing Ground "A-10", the airfield consisted of a single 5000' (1500m) Prefabricated Hessian Surfacing runway aligned 08/26.

In addition, tents were erected for billeting and also for support facilities; an access road was built to the existing road infrastructure; a dump was created for supplies, ammunition, and gasoline drums, along with a drinkable water; and a minimal electrical grid for communications and station lighting was installed.

The fighter planes flew support missions during the Allied invasion of Normandy, patrolling roads in front of the beachhead; strafing German military vehicles and dropping bombs on gun emplacements, anti-aircraft artillery and concentrations of German troops when spotted.

After the Americans moved east into Central France with the advancing Allied Armies, the airfield was left un-garrisoned and used for resupply and casualty evacuation.   It was closed on 4 November 1944.

Major units assigned
 50th Fighter Group 20 June - 23 August 1944 
 10th (TS), 81st (2N), 313th (W3) Fighter Squadrons (P-47)
 392d Fighter Squadron (H5)  25 June - 16 August 1944 (P-38)

Current use
After its closure by the Americans, the airfield was returned to farmland.  Today, the Normandy Victory Museum utilizes part of the original site of the old A10 Airfield of Carentan, first aerodrome re-opened since 1944.  It presents the Battle of Normandy known as "the hedgerow hell" and received a P47 2N-U replica.

There is a monument to the A-10 Airfield at the junction of D 974, ex N13 toward Carentan, with D 89, turn left towards Saint Pellerin. The monument is 400 meters left, rue de Banville.

See also

 Advanced Landing Ground

References

External links

 Normandy Tank Museum
 A-10 Memorial
 A-10 Carentan (In French)

World War II airfields in France
Airfields of the United States Army Air Forces in France
Airports established in 1944